The 37th American Society of Cinematographers Awards were held and livestreamed worldwide on March 5, 2023, at The Beverly Hilton in Beverly Hills, California, to honor the best cinematographers of film and television in 2022. For her work on Elvis, Mandy Walker became the first woman to win for Theatrical Feature Film.

The nominees were announced on January 9, 2023. Actress Viola Davis received the Board of the Governors Award in honor of her "groundbreaking contributions to the cinematic space".

Winners and nominees
Winners are listed first and in bold.

Film

Television

References

External links
 

2022
2022 film awards
2022 television awards
2022 in American cinema
American